Scott Gairdner (born 1985) is an American comedy writer, director, and podcaster, known for having created the Comedy Central animated series Moonbeam City, for promoting the cult phenomenon of The Room, alongside filmmaker Michael Rousselet, and for co-creating and co-hosting the theme park podcast Podcast: The Ride since 2017. He created Tiny Fuppets.

He is married to Erin Pade and has one child with her.

Career
After studying film production at Loyola Marymount University, Gairdner began his career by uploading comedy videos onto his YouTube channel, which he started in 2006, including the "Sex Offender Shuffle." For two years (2010–2012) he worked at Funny or Die as a staff writer and director.

In 2012, he was hired to work for the TBS show Conan as a writer and director. During his time working for Conan, he shot dozens of sketches for the show. 

He created and serves as the executive producer of Moonbeam City, an animated series on Comedy Central that debuted on September 16, 2015. Gairdner credits the videos he posted on his YouTube channel for gaining the attention of Funny or Die, and later, Conan, which in turn served as the "springboard" that led to him being able to create Moonbeam City.

In 2017, as part of promoting the latest installment in his Clip Cup series, Gairdner helped launch the fictitious OTT platform Vioobu, which managed to dupe several publications, as well as viewers, due to its expansive library of content.

Since 2017, Gairdner has co-hosted a theme park podcast, Podcast: The Ride, alongside fellow comedians and theme park fans Mike Carlson and Jason Sheridan.

Awards

Gairdner succeeded musician and actor Gary Sinise when he received the National Daddy Award in 2017, 2019, and 2022. He has also been voted as one of three "Disney Daddiez" by prominent members of the theme park journalism industry.

References

External links

American comedy writers
Living people
Loyola Marymount University alumni
Conan (talk show)
1987 births